Te Rapa is a mixed light industrial, large-scale retail and semi-rural suburb to the northwest of central Hamilton, New Zealand that is built on a flat area that was previously the bed of an ancient river, the forerunner to the present Waikato River.

Stretching in a long, thin north–south axis, Te Rapa is home to many factories including Te Rapa Dairy Factory, one of the largest of its kind in the world.

Te Rapa has freight and locomotive depots on the North Island Main Trunk railway.

History 

Te Rapa and neighbouring Pukete were important sites for the kauri gum trade of the late 19th/early 20th centuries, being some of the southern-most locations where gum could be found.

Demographics 

Te Rapa had a population of 294 at the 2018 New Zealand census, a decrease of 12 people (−3.9%) since the 2013 census, and a decrease of 33 people (−10.1%) since the 2006 census. There were 102 households, comprising 171 males and 126 females, giving a sex ratio of 1.36 males per female, with 51 people (17.3%) aged under 15 years, 54 (18.4%) aged 15 to 29, 138 (46.9%) aged 30 to 64, and 45 (15.3%) aged 65 or older.

Ethnicities were 82.7% European/Pākehā, 21.4% Māori, 2.0% Pacific peoples, 8.2% Asian, and 1.0% other ethnicities. People may identify with more than one ethnicity.

The percentage of people born overseas was 15.3, compared with 27.1% nationally.

Although some people chose not to answer the census's question about religious affiliation, 51.0% had no religion, 33.7% were Christian, 1.0% were Hindu, 2.0% were Muslim and 3.1% had other religions.

Of those at least 15 years old, 45 (18.5%) people had a bachelor's or higher degree, and 45 (18.5%) people had no formal qualifications. 30 people (12.3%) earned over $70,000 compared to 17.2% nationally. The employment status of those at least 15 was that 132 (54.3%) people were employed full-time, 39 (16.0%) were part-time, and 6 (2.5%) were unemployed.

Te Rapa area unit had these census results -

For the 2018 census there were some boundary changes and north and south are shown above. For comparison, the equivalent 2013 populations were 186 (North) and 120 (South), which is 33 fewer than in the earlier area.

The median age at the 2013 census is high at 74.5 and income low, largely because 267 live in meshblock 0908100, where Metlifecare's Forest Lake Gardens Retirement Complex has been built since 2001 and the median age is 79 and income $23,300. In 2001 that meshblock had only 39 residents, with a median age of 34.5.

Shops

Post Offices 
There are two Post Shops in Te Rapa, at The Base and at Video Ezy, which, until 2018, was one of the last two in Hamilton renting DVDs, Play Station and videos.

The Base

Before being given by the government to the Tainui tribe in a Raupatu land settlement in 1995, Te Rapa was also the site of a Royal New Zealand Air Force base. The Te Rapa Air force Base was a major Air Force stores depot. The Te Rapa Air force Base closed in 1992.

Te Rapa's shopping area includes The Base, a large scale retail development that opened in 2005 at the site of the former air force base. As of 2006, The Base contained the largest branch of The Warehouse in New Zealand. With the addition of the Te Awa building in 2010, The Base became New Zealand's largest shopping mall, and still is, as of December 2011.

Fonterra Dairy Factory 
One of Fonterra's largest dairy factories is to the east of the former SH1 in northern Te Rapa. It started to dry powder in 1967 and was officially opened on 20 April 1968 by New Zealand Co-operative Dairy Company, which became part of Fonterra in 2001. A butter, cream and cream cheese plant was added in 1997 another cream cheese line in 2013 and another butter line about 2019.

It has around 500 staff, producing roughly 80,000 tonnes a year, including 650 million packets of butter and 33,500 tonnes of cream cheese.

It is powered by a cogeneration unit, which uses 27 petajoules of Genesis gas over 6 years.

Te Rapa Racecourse 
Located in Te Rapa is Te Rapa Racecourse, Hamilton's only remaining horse racing course, and the main racecourse for the Waikato region. It has a symmetrical left-handed (anti-clockwise) track with a circumference of 1788 metres. 

The course originated with Waikato Turf Club in 1873, which met at Whatawhata and Pirongia.

Facilities and hospitalities include a members' facility and private suites.

Major races held at the Te Rapa racecourse include:

 Waikato Cup over 2400m in early December.
 Waikato Sprint over 1400m in February.
 New Zealand International Stakes also known as the Herbie Dyke Stakes, a weight-for-age event over 2000m in February.

Waterworld 

Waterworld (also known as Te Rapa Pools) is a Hamilton city council-owned pool complex in Te Rapa. In addition to the main facilities, the venue also includes a range of other options including a spa, sauna and steam rooms as well as an outdoor playground. Rides offered at Waterworld include The Python Hydroslide, the Twister Slide and The Screamer Speedslides. The complex was officially opened in late 1976, 15 years after Hamilton Jaycees suggested a new swimming pool complex in Fairfield Park. The suggestion led to an adopted proposal in 1964 to mark the city's centennial and in 1973 the decision was made to instead build the complex in Te Rapa.

Transport

Road 
Immediately after the invasion of the Waikato, in 1864, there was just a track across the area linking Mangaharakeke (or Manuharakeke) Pā and Kirikiriroa Pā. By 1870 bridges had been built over the streams. An 1875 report said the bridges at Waitawhiriwhiri, Mangaharakeke, Beere's Creek and Hall's Creek, between Ngāruawāhia and Hamilton on the Great South Road, had been replaced, or repaired. Until Mangaharakeke Dr opened in 2012, much of the 1860s road, now known as Te Rapa Rd, was part of SH1. See also - List of streets in Hamilton.

Railway 

Te Rapa railway station opened when the North Island Main Trunk was extended from Ngāruawāhia to Hamilton on 19 December 1877. Te Rapa is at the northern end of the section to Palmerston North, electrified in 1988. Electrification ends just north of the  post (distance north of Wellington). A locomotive depot and marshalling yard incorporated the Racecourse station site. There is also a concrete sleeper factory at Te Rapa.

Te Rapa Racecourse station 
£720 was spent to open Te Rapa Racecourse passenger platform, near the south-west end of the course, on 15 October 1924. The first excursions seem to have been advertised for Labour Day, 27 October 1924. The last advert was in November 1943. In 1930 the line was double tracked and equipped with automatic signalling. By January 1935 horse loading banks had been completed. Approval to remove them was given in 1953, after being disused for years. Final closure was in late 1967. Aerial photos show that the site of the station, and an area to the north, was later used for the marshalling yard and then the locomotive and freight depot.

Freight

Crawford Street depot 
Fonterra's Crawford St depot is linked by rail to local dairy factories at Te Awamutu, Morrinsville, Waitoa, Hautapu, Waharoa, Lichfield and Tīrau.  It sends about 33,000 containers of milk powder and cheese a year for export via the Port of Tauranga. An automated cool store was added in 2009 to handle about 235,000 tonnes a year.

Te Rapa Marshalling Yard 
Construction of a new marshalling yard near the Racecourse began in December 1967. The yard replaced Frankton goods yard and opened on 10 January 1971. It had a hump for shunting, which used Westinghouse retarders and 31 sidings.

Education 
Te Rapa School is a full primary school catering for years 1-8. It has  students. Te Rapa School has been the local primary school since 1906.

St Peter Chanel Catholic School is a state integrated full primary school catering for years 1-8. It has  students.

Both these schools are coeducational. Rolls are as of

References

External links 
 
 
1973 photo of retarder at railway marshalling yard
 NZTA live cameras at Te Rapa / Wairere Drive junction

Suburbs of Hamilton, New Zealand
Defunct railway stations in New Zealand
Rail transport in Waikato